Riley Leonard (born September 13, 2002) is an American football quarterback for the Duke Blue Devils.

High school career
Leonard attended Fairhope High School in Fairhope, Alabama. As a senior, he passed for 1,900 yards and 25 touchdowns and had 500 rushing yards. He committed to Duke University to play college football. Leonard also played basketball in high school.

College career
Leonard played in seven games and made one start as a true freshman at Duke in 2021. For the season, he completed 37 of 62 passes for 381 yards with one touchdown and one interception. Leonard was named the starting quarterback entering his sophomore season in 2022.

Statistics

References

External links
Duke Blue Devils bio

2002 births
Living people
Players of American football from Alabama
American football quarterbacks
Duke Blue Devils football players